DAUM, the Institute for Dialectology, Onomastics and Folklore Research in Umeå, is a Swedish governmental archive bureau which collects, preserves, work up and provides information about dialects, place names, folklore culture and local history. DAUM is part of the Swedish Institute for Language and Folklore.

External links
website at Swedish Institute for Language and Folklore

Dialectology
Swedish culture
Swedish folklorists
Dialectology
Umeå